Kassim Doumbia (born 6 October 1990) is a Malian footballer who plays as a defender for Roeselare.

He has previously played for ASKO, Gent, Brussels, Waasland-Beveren, FH, and Maribor.

Career
Kassim Doumbia started playing football on the streets of the Malian capital Bamako. His first club in his home country was ASKO. In the winter of the 2008–09 season, he signed a contract with the Belgian club Gent, where he spent his first half of the season in Gent's B team.

In his second season, the club promoted him to the first team. He did not, however, play any official matches during the 2009–10 season. In 2010, he was put out on a year-long loan to the second division side Brussels.

In June 2011, he signed a contract with Waasland-Beveren for the next two seasons, and at the beginning of his time with the club, they were promoted to the Belgian Pro League. On 22 December 2012 he scored his first goal for his club in a 2–2 away tie against Cercle Brugge.

In April 2014, he signed a two-year contract with the Icelandic club FH Hafnarfjörður and prolonged his contract for two more years until the end of 2017. With FH, he won two Icelandic championships.

In December 2017, he signed with the Slovenian club Maribor. In January 2019, he left the club without making a single appearance in official matches after his contract was mutually terminated. Doumbia then joined Belgian club Lierse Kempenzonen in the summer 2019. In January 2020, he was sent down to Lierse's B-team alongside François D'Onofrio.

References

External links
Soccerway profile

1990 births
Living people
Malian footballers
Malian expatriate footballers
Association football defenders
K.A.A. Gent players
R.W.D.M. Brussels F.C. players
S.K. Beveren players
Fimleikafélag Hafnarfjarðar players
NK Maribor players
Lierse Kempenzonen players
Belgian Pro League players
Belgian Third Division players
Challenger Pro League players
Expatriate footballers in Belgium
Expatriate footballers in Iceland
Expatriate footballers in Slovenia
Malian expatriate sportspeople in Belgium
21st-century Malian people